In Desert and Wilderness is a 2001 Polish film directed by Gavin Hood. Adapted from the 1911 novel In Desert and Wilderness by  Henryk Sienkiewicz, it tells the story of two children, Staś Tarkowski and Nel Rawlison, kidnapped by the rebels during Mahdi's rebellion in Sudan.

Filming took three months. It was filmed in South Africa and Tunisia. The original director fell ill at the very beginning of filming and his role was taken by Hood. A miniseries version of the film was later broadcast in 2002. Its content differed from the book and the film was said to be more modern, notably in its depiction of intercultural relationships. The film enjoyed considerable success.

Cast 
  as Nel Rawlison
 Adam Fidusiewicz as Staś Tarkowski
 Artur Żmijewski as Władysław Tarkowski (Staś's father)
 Andrzej Strzelecki as George Rawlinson (Nel's father)
 Mzwandile Ngubeni as Kali
 Lungile Shongwe as Mea
  as Chamis
 Lotfi Dziri as Gebhr
 Ahmed Hafiane as Idrys
 Krzysztof Kowalewski as Kalioupoli
 Krzysztof Kolberger as Linde
  as Madame Olivier
 Hichem Rostom as Mahdi

Reception
It was the second most popular Polish film of the year behind Quo Vadis with 2.2 million admissions.

References

External links 

2000s Polish-language films
2001 films
Films based on Polish novels
Films based on works by Henryk Sienkiewicz
Films directed by Gavin Hood
Films set in the 1880s
Films set in deserts
Films set in Sudan